The Journal of Zoology is a scientific journal concerning zoology, the study of animals. It was founded in 1830 by the Zoological Society of London and is published by Wiley-Blackwell. It carries original research papers, which are targeted towards general readers. Some of the articles are available via open access, depending on the author's wishes. According to the Journal Citation Reports, the journal has a 2020 impact factor of 2.322, ranking it 36th out of 175 journals in the category "Zoology".

From around 1833, it was known as the Proceedings of the Zoological Society of London. From 1965 to 1984, it was known as the Journal of Zoology: Proceedings of the Zoological Society of London.

See also
 List of zoology journals

References

External links

 
 BHL Digitised Proceedings of the Zoological Society of London 1833 (Part 1) - 1922
 

Zoology journals
Wiley-Blackwell academic journals
English-language journals
Publications established in 1830
Monthly journals
Zoological Society of London
Academic journals associated with learned and professional societies
1830 establishments in England